At Their Best may refer to:

 At Their Best, a 1998 compilation album of The Dubliners
 At Their Best, a compilation album by Pentangle, 1983
 At Their Best (Spinners album), 1999
 At Their Best (The Supremes album), 1978
 At Their Best (Whitecross album), 1991